The 1939 South American Championships in Athletics  were held in Lima, Peru. This edition marked the introduction of athletic events for women competitors between 25 and 28 May.

Medal summary

Men's events

Women's events

Medal table

References

External links
 Men Results – GBR Athletics
 Women Results – GBR Athletics
 Medallists

S
South American Championships in Athletics
Sports competitions in Lima
International athletics competitions hosted by Peru
1939 in South American sport